The men's decathlon event at the 2014 Asian Games was held at the Incheon Asiad Main Stadium, Incheon, South Korea on 30 September – 1 October.

Schedule
All times are Korea Standard Time (UTC+09:00)

Records

Results
Legend
DNF — Did not finish
DNS — Did not start

100 metres 
 Wind – Heat 1: +2.1 m/s
 Wind – Heat 2: +1.7 m/s

Long jump

Shot put

High jump

400 metres

110 metres hurdles
 Wind – Heat 1: +0.2 m/s
 Wind – Heat 2: +1.9 m/s

Discus throw

Pole vault

Javelin throw

1500 metres

Summary

References

Decathlon
2014 men